The discography of American heavy metal band Disturbed includes eight studio albums, two live albums, one compilation album, one extended play, 29 singles, three video albums, and 27 music videos. The band formed when guitarist Dan Donegan, drummer Mike Wengren and bassist Steve "Fuzz" Kmak hired vocalist David Draiman in 1996. A demo tape led to their signing to Giant Records, which released their debut album, The Sickness, in March 2000. The album reached the top 30 on the United States' Billboard 200, and the Australian ARIA Charts. Since its release, The Sickness was certified 5x platinum, a measure of its high sales volume, in the US by the Recording Industry Association of America (RIAA), 2x platinum in Canada by Music Canada, and platinum in Australia by the Australian Recording Industry Association (ARIA).  Four singles were released from the album, "Stupify", "Voices", "The Game", and "Down with the Sickness"; the latter of which was the most successful, having been certified platinum by the RIAA.

In March 2002, Disturbed released the documentary M.O.L., which showed some of the band's more personal moments in the studio and during tours, and featured several music videos and live performances. M.O.L. was later certified platinum by ARIA. Disturbed then released their second studio album, Believe, in September 2002. It peaked at number one on the US Billboard 200 and New Zealand's Recording Industry Association of New Zealand (RIANZ) charts, as well as number two on the Canadian Albums Chart. Believe was certified double platinum by the RIAA, and platinum by ARIA and the Canadian Recording Industry Association (CRIA).The album's first single, "Prayer", peaked at number 14 on the Canadian Singles Chart, and number 31 on the UK Singles Chart. A music video directed by the Brothers Strause included the song, but because scenes in the video resembled footage of the September 11 attacks, most television stations refused to play it. The single was followed-up by "Remember", which failed to reach the success of its predecessor. The 2003 tour Music as a Weapon II was documented on the live album, which also featured the bands Taproot, Chevelle, and Ünloco. It was released in February 2004, and reached number 148 on the US Billboard 200.

Three years after the release of Believe, Disturbed released their third studio album, Ten Thousand Fists, in September 2005. The album reached the same positions that its predecessor had; topping the US Billboard 200 and New Zealand RIANZ charts, and peaking at number two on the Canadian Albums Charts. It also was certified platinum in the US, Australia, and Canada. Ten Thousand Fists spawned singles such as "Guarded", "Just Stop", the Genesis cover of "Land of Confusion", and "Stricken". The latter charted at number 95 on the US Billboard Hot 100, and at number 88 on the UK Singles Chart. "Stricken" was later certified gold by the RIAA. Disturbed's fourth studio album, Indestructible, was released in June 2008. Like its predecessor, it peaked at number one on the US and New Zealand charts; it also reached the top position of the Canadian and Australian charts. Four singles were released for Indestructible, the title track, "Perfect Insanity", "The Night and "Inside the Fire" (which peaked at number-one on the Mainstream Rock Songs, was certified gold by the RIAA, and was nominated for a Grammy Award in the category Best Hard Rock Performance). The band has released five consecutive number-one albums that have charted on the Billboard 200, with the release of their fifth studio album Asylum. Asylum was followed five years later by Immortalized (2015). The album featured a cover of "The Sound of Silence", which became their highest peaking song on the Billboard Hot 100, peaking at number 42.

Albums

Studio albums

Compilation albums

Live albums

Extended plays

Singles

Promotional singles

Other charted songs

Videos

Video albums

Music videos

Notes

References
General

 Disturbed – Discography
 
 

Specific

External links
 
 

Discography
Heavy metal group discographies
Discographies of American artists